Leo Pilo Echegaray (11 July 1960 – 5 February 1999) was the first Filipino to be executed after its reinstatement in the Philippines in 1993, some 23 years after the last judicial execution was carried out. His death sparked national debate over the legality and morality of capital punishment, which was later suspended on 15 April 2006.

Trial and execution
In 1994, Echegaray, a house painter, was accused of repeatedly raping Rodessa, the 10-year-old daughter of his live-in-partner (Rodessa was nicknamed "Baby" by the press). During Echegaray's trial, Rodessa's mother accused her daughter of lying and claimed that the accusation was motivated by the greed of Rodessa's grandmother. On September 7, 1994, Echegaray was convicted by Branch 104 of the Regional Trial Court in Quezon City of rape and was sentenced to death. The death sentence was automatically reviewed by the Supreme Court and confirmed on June 25, 1996. Echegaray filed a motion to appeal, which was denied on January 19, 1999. 

Less than a month later, Echegaray was executed via lethal injection on February 5, 1999. Echegaray was told of the court ruling at noon, three hours before he was to die by lethal injection at Manila's New Bilibid Prison. He would have been the first man to be executed in the Philippines since 1976.

Echegaray's final statement was:"Sámbayanáng Pilipino, patawarin ako sa kasalanang ipinaratang ninyo sa akin. Pilipino, pinatáy ng kapwa Pilipino."("People of the Philippines, forgive me of the sin which you have accused me. A Filipino, killed by fellow Filipinos.")Although Echegaray initially maintained his innocence throughout his trial and in public, he privately admitted his guilt during his last moments. Echegaray's last words were "Baby, forgive me." He was pronounced dead eight minutes later.

See also
Capital punishment in the Philippines

References

External links

 Enbanc Decision (1996-06-25) People of the Philippines vs. Leo Echegaray (GR 117472) Supreme Court of the Philippines. Retrieved on 22 December 2006.
 Enbanc Decision 1998-10-12) Leo Echegaray vs. Secretary of Justice, et al. (G.R. No. 132601.  January 19, 1999)  Supreme Court of the Philippines. Retrieved on 22 December 2006.
 Enbanc Resolution (1999-01-19) Leo Echegaray vs. Secretary of  Justice, et al.(G.R. No. 132601.  January 19, 1999)  Supreme Court of the Philippines. Retrieved on 22 December 2006.
  People of the Philippines vs. Leo Echegaray y Pilo (G.R. No. 117472) - text of the Philippine Supreme Court ruling affirming the death penalty
 Leo Echegaray vs. Secretary of Justice, et al. - text of the motion for reconsideration (i.e. the decision on Echegaray's appeal)
 First Philippine execution in 22 years set for January (CNN)
 Death Penalty in the Philippines

External links
 Associated Press archive:
"PHILIPPINES: CHILD RAPIST ECHEGARAY EXECUTION (3)."
"PHILIPPINES: CHILD RAPIST ECHEGARAY EXECUTED (V)."

1960 births
1999 deaths
Filipino rapists
People executed for rape
Executed Filipino people
People executed by the Philippines by lethal injection